Luigi Sgarbozza (born 21 June 1944, in Amaseno) is an Italian former cyclist.

Major results

1966
1st Giro d'Abruzzo
1967
2nd Trofeo Matteotti
1968
1st Stage 14 Giro d'Italia
1969
1st Stage 3 Vuelta a España
2nd Trofeo Matteotti
3rd Sassari–Cagliari
1970
2nd Overall Giro della Provincia di Reggio Calabria
3rd Milano–Vignola
1971
2nd Giro dell'Umbria
3rd Milano–Vignola

References

1944 births
Living people
Italian male cyclists
Sportspeople from the Province of Frosinone
Cyclists from Lazio